Ross Aaron Malinger (born July 7, 1984) is an American former actor and automobile salesperson. He is best known for his roles as Jonah Baldwin in the 1993 movie Sleepless in Seattle, starring Tom Hanks, and as Bobby Jameson in the 1997 Disney comedy film Toothless, starring Kirstie Alley. He and Alley co-starred in the 1995 television film Peter and the Wolf. He played Adam Lippman, the Bar Mitzvah boy who liked Elaine's "Shiksa appeal", in the Seinfeld episode "The Serenity Now".

Life and career
Malinger was born in Redwood City, California, the son of Laura, a producer, and Brian Malinger, a producer and sales representative.

Malinger appeared with Jean-Claude Van Damme in the 1995 film Sudden Death.

He provided the original voice of T.J. on the animated series Recess. Due to his voice breaking, he did not reprise the role in the next seasons and was replaced by Andrew Lawrence. He was a recurring character on the teen drama Party of Five.

He also provided the voice for the puppy Spike, part of the "Riley Gang" in Homeward Bound II: Lost in San Francisco; and played the role of Payton Shoemaker in Little Bigfoot.

He starred with Shelley Long and Treat Williams on the CBS comedy Good Advice, which lasted two seasons, 1993 to 1994.

He was in an episode of Touched by an Angel playing Nick Albright, a troubled teenager after his parents' separation. He appeared in an episode of Without a Trace in 2006 as Jason McMurphy.

Malinger has since retired from acting, and has worked at a series of car dealerships in the Greater Los Angeles area.  He also earned an Associate degree from Moorpark College.

Filmography
Beverly Hills, 90210 (1990) - Elliott Brody
Kindergarten Cop (1990) - Harvey
Who's the Boss (1990–1991) - Travis, Wild Kid #1, Rory
Eve of Destruction (1991) - Timmy Arnold
Late for Dinner (1991) - Little Donald Freeman
Roseanne (1991) - Sammy Miller
Davis Rules (1991) -
In Sickness and in Health (1992) - Michael
Sleepless in Seattle (1993) - Jonah Baldwin
Good Advice (1993–1994) - Michael DeRuzza
Bye Bye Love (1995) - Ben
Dr. Quinn, Medicine Woman (1994–1995) - Steven Myers
Sudden Death (1995) - Tyler McCord
Peter and the Wolf (1995) - Peter (voice)
Maybe This Time (1996) - Nicky
Homeward Bound II: Lost in San Francisco (1996) - Spike (voice)
Touched by an Angel (1996, 2001) - Jesse Bell, Nick Albright
Nick Freno: Licensed Teacher (1996–1997) - Tyler Hale
Little Bigfoot (1997) - Payton
Toothless (1997) - Bobby Jameson
Seinfeld (1997) - Adam Lippman
Suddenly Susan (1997) - Doug Naughton Jr.
Adventures in Odyssey: In Harm's Way (1997) - Additional voicesRecess (1997–1998) - T.J. Detweiler (voice)The Simple Life (1998) - WillThe Animated Adventures of Tom Sawyer (1998) - Tom Sawyer (voice)Club Vampire (1998) - MaxParty of Five (1998) - Jamie BurkeFrog and Wombat (1998) - Steve JohnsonFamily Law (1999) - HenryPersonally Yours (2000) - DerekRecess Christmas: Miracle on Third Street (2001) - T.J. Detweiler (voice)Recess: All Growed Down (2003) - Older T.J. Detweiler (voice)Without a Trace'' (2006) - Jason McMurphy

References

External links

1984 births
20th-century American male actors
21st-century American male actors
American male child actors
American male film actors
American male voice actors
Living people
Male actors from California
People from Redwood City, California